Whetstone Creek is a north flowing stream in Wright County, Missouri. It is a tributary of the Gasconade River.

The stream headwaters are just south of Mountain Grove and cross under U. S. Route 60 just west of that city. The stream meanders north crossing under Missouri Route N and continuing roughly parallel with Missouri Route E past Owens and under Missouri Route 38 east of Rayborn to its confluence with the Gasconade River.

Whetstone Creek was named for the fact whetstones were sourced from its banks.

See also
List of rivers of Missouri

References

Rivers of Wright County, Missouri
Rivers of Missouri